Byron Cage: Live At New Birth Cathedral (a.k.a. Prince of Praise) is the solo, self-titled, debut and third overall album by Byron Cage, released in 2003 on Gospocentric Records.  The album was recorded live in Atlanta, Georgia and features production by famed gospel vocalist Kurt Carr.

Live at New Birth Cathedral peaked at #4 on the U.S. Gospel charts.

Track listing

Byron Cage albums
2003 live albums